Western Nebraska Community College (WNCC) is a public community college in Scottsbluff, Nebraska. It also has campuses in Sidney, Nebraska, and Alliance, Nebraska.

WNCC was previously known as Scottsbluff Junior College, Scotts Bluff County College, and Nebraska Western College. Its athletics teams are known as the Cougars.

History
Western Nebraska Community College was established in Scottsbluff, Nebraska in September 1926 as an extension of the University of Nebraska. WNCC was originally named Scottsbluff Junior College. The College became inactive after only one year and was reopened in September 1929, as part of the Scottsbluff Public Schools System. The College operated as part of that system until September 1932, when it became a public, two-year institution. In June 1968, Scotts Bluff County College became Nebraska Western College.  The College became Scottsbluff’s only non-parochial institution of higher education after private Hiram Scott College went bankrupt in 1971 and was acquired by the state.

The State Legislature formed the Western Technical Community College Area in 1973, which included Nebraska Western College, Western Nebraska Technical College and the Alliance School of Practical Nursing. On July 1, 1978, the Area Board of Governors placed all three entities into a single college, multiple campus setting. July 1, 1988, the Board of Governors discontinued the separate campus names and changed the name of the college to Western Nebraska Community College.

Sidney Campus
In October 1966, classes began at the technical vocational school. The school changed its name to Western Nebraska Technical College in 1971. On July 1, 1978, the Area Board of Governors placed all three entities (Nebraska Western College, Western Nebraska Technical College, and Alliance School of Practical Nursing) into a single college, multiple campus setting. July 1, 1988, the Board of Governors discontinued the separate campus names and changed the name of the college to Western Nebraska Community College.

Alliance Campus
The Alliance School of Practical Nursing started in 1957 in Alliance, Nebraska at St. Josephs Hospital. In 1979, the school hired a part-time coordinator and began offering a variety of general education and vocational classes in conjunction with Nebraska Western College. On July 1, 1978, the Area Board of Governors placed all three entities (Nebraska Western College, Western Nebraska Technical College, and Alliance School of Practical Nursing) into a single college, multiple campus setting. July 1, 1988, the Board of Governors discontinued the separate campus names and changed the name of the college to Western Nebraska Community College.

John N. Harms Advanced Technology Center
Given the increase in demand for worker training, retraining and economic development activities, the College established the Center for Business and Individual Training (CBIT). The CBIT, now known as the John N. Harms Advanced Technology Center of Nebraska (HATC).  Named after former Western Nebraska Community College president (who served from 1976 to 2006) John Harms, HATC provides short-term, high-impact skills training to assist in job creation and capacity building for area companies. The  facility includes computer-based training, construction trades, machine tool and hazardous materials training, in addition to flexible training spaces.

Notable alumni
 Bobby Jackson, professional basketball player
 Dick "Night Train" Lane, professional football player
 Sedric Toney, professional basketball player

References

External links
 Official website

 
Two-year colleges in the United States
Community colleges in Nebraska
Education in Scotts Bluff County, Nebraska
Education in Cheyenne County, Nebraska
Education in Box Butte County, Nebraska
Buildings and structures in Scotts Bluff County, Nebraska
Buildings and structures in Cheyenne County, Nebraska
Buildings and structures in Box Butte County, Nebraska
NJCAA athletics